Grisel Mendoza (born 29 May 1956) is a Mexican former swimmer. She competed in the women's 200 metre butterfly at the 1972 Summer Olympics.

References

1956 births
Living people
Mexican female swimmers
Olympic swimmers of Mexico
Swimmers at the 1972 Summer Olympics
Place of birth missing (living people)
20th-century Mexican women